Individual awards handed out by the Basketligan, the top level basketball league of Sweden.

MVP

Finals MVP

Defensive Player of the Year

Rookie of the Year

Guard, Forward and Center of the Year

References

 
Awards
Sweden
basketball